The canton of Pays de Lafayette is an administrative division of the Haute-Loire department, south-central France. It was created at the French canton reorganisation which came into effect in March 2015. Its seat is in Mazeyrat-d'Allier.

It consists of the following communes:
 
Ally
Arlet
Aubazat
Blassac
Cerzat
Chassagnes
Chastel
Chavaniac-Lafayette
Chilhac
La Chomette
Collat
Couteuges
Cronce
Domeyrat
Ferrussac
Frugières-le-Pin
Javaugues
Jax
Josat
Lavoûte-Chilhac
Lubilhac
Mazerat-Aurouze
Mazeyrat-d'Allier
Mercœur
Montclard
Paulhaguet
Saint-Austremoine
Saint-Beauzire
Saint-Cirgues
Saint-Didier-sur-Doulon
Sainte-Eugénie-de-Villeneuve
Sainte-Marguerite
Saint-Georges-d'Aurac
Saint-Ilpize
Saint-Just-près-Brioude
Saint-Préjet-Armandon
Saint-Privat-du-Dragon
Salzuit
Vals-le-Chastel
Villeneuve-d'Allier
Vissac-Auteyrac

References

Cantons of Haute-Loire